Listrocerum fuscopicalis is a species of beetle in the family Cerambycidae. It was described by Stephan von Breuning in 1961. It is known from Cameroon.

References

Endemic fauna of Cameroon
Dorcaschematini
Beetles described in 1961